Lorna Marie-Therese Trigwell married name Lorna Smith is a South African international lawn bowler. She is regarded as one of the leading players in the world after winning multiple medals.

Bowls career

Commonwealth Games
Trigwell has won four Commonwealth Games medals at consecutive games. In 1994, she won a gold medal in the Women's fours at the 1994 Commonwealth Games in Victoria with Anna Pretorius, Colleen Grondein and Hester Bekker. It was the first time that South Africa had won a gold medal since 1958, following the return from their Anti-Apartheid Movement Commonwealth ban enforced in 1961.

Four years later she repeated the feat in Kuala Lumpur when winning gold with Hester Bekker, Loraine Victor, and Trish Steyn at the Women's fours. She then won consecutive singles bronze medals at the 2002 Commonwealth Games and the 2006 Commonwealth Games.

World Outdoor Championships
She has won three World Outdoor Championship medals at consecutive championships. After three bronze medals and a silver medal a fourth gold arrived in 2008, when she won the triples by winning the Women's Triples at the 2008 World Outdoor Bowls Championship in Christchurch.

Atlantic Championships
In 1995 she won the pairs gold medal (with Jo Peacock and the fours silver medal at the Atlantic Bowls Championships. Two years later she won fours gold at Llandrindod Wells and in Cape Town in 1999 she repreated the fours gold success. A fifth medal was won in 1997 when winning a silver in the fours.

In 2011 under her married name of Lorna Smith and bowling for Scotland she won the triples gold medal at the Championships and in 2015 she won the triples bronze medal bringing her total to seven medal of which four were gold.

Scotland
In 2008 she emigrated to Scotland and took up residence there. From 2012-2014 she set a Scottish record of three consecutive Scottish National Bowls Championships, bowling for the Linlithgow Bowling Club. Controversy followed after the 2012 success because she was then overlooked by the Scottish selectors for the 2012 World Outdoor Bowls Championship and as a consequence made herself unavailable for the 2014 Commonwealth Games.

References

Living people
1954 births
South African female bowls players
Bowls World Champions
Bowls players at the 1994 Commonwealth Games
Bowls players at the 1998 Commonwealth Games
Bowls players at the 2002 Commonwealth Games
Bowls players at the 2006 Commonwealth Games
Commonwealth Games gold medallists for South Africa
Commonwealth Games bronze medallists for South Africa
Commonwealth Games medallists in lawn bowls
Medallists at the 1994 Commonwealth Games
Medallists at the 1998 Commonwealth Games
Medallists at the 2002 Commonwealth Games
Medallists at the 2006 Commonwealth Games